Phyllis Blackler (13 June 1919 – 25 May 1975) was a New Zealand cricketer who played as an all-rounder, batting right-handed and bowling right-arm leg break. She appeared in twelve Test matches for New Zealand between 1948 and 1966. She played domestic cricket for Canterbury and Wellington.

References

External links
 
 

1919 births
1975 deaths
Cricketers from Christchurch
New Zealand women cricketers
New Zealand women Test cricketers
Canterbury Magicians cricketers
Wellington Blaze cricketers